Lee Ho-Joon (born February 8, 1976, in Gwangju, South Korea) is a former South Korean professional baseball designated hitter and first baseman in the Korea Baseball Organization. He bats and throws right-handed. Lee ranks fourth all-time in the KBO League in both home runs and runs batted in.

Amateur career
While attending Gwangju Jaeil High School, Lee was considered one of the top high school hitting pitchers, batting fourth in the team's batting order and pitching No.1 in the starting rotation. In November 1993 Lee was selected as a member of the South Korea junior national baseball team along with Cho In-Sung and competed in the friendly baseball series against the Japanese regional high school all-star teams. Lee helped Team Korea sweep the six-game series as a starting pitcher and first baseman.

Professional career

Haitai Tigers / Kia Tigers
He made eight appearances as a relief pitcher for the Tigers, posting a 10.22 earned run average and allowing seven home runs in 12 1/3 inning pitched. After his horrendous rookie season, Lee converted his position to first base.

In , his first season as a position player, Lee batted .167 having three hits in 18 at-bats.

The next year was Lee's break-out season. He hit .303, the first .300 season of his career, and smacked 19 home runs with 77 RBI, becoming a fixture at first base and batting fourth in batting order for the Tigers.

He finished with a .276 batting average, 16 home runs and 55 RBI playing in 107 games as a first baseman.

SK Wyverns
During the  season, Lee was traded to the SK Wyverns.

In , Lee batted .280 with 30 home runs (third) and 87 runs (eighth); he led the league in RBI with a career-high 112.

Lee set a KBO record on May 20,  when he was walked in six consecutive plate appearances (a record tied by Kim Tae-kyun in ). He accomplished the feat in one game. In 127 games, Lee batted .300 with 78 RBI (seventh), 18 home runs (seventh) and a career-high 72 walks (third).

NC Dinos
The  KBO Expansion Draft for the newly founded NC Dinos was held after the 2012 season. Lee was picked up in the expansion draft by the Dinos and became the Dinos' everyday designated hitter. In 2013, he was selected as a captain of NC Dinos. In 126 games, Lee batted .278 with 87 RBI (seventh), 20 home runs (seventh) and 60 walks. He had a remarkable season at age 39 in 2015, when he hit .294 with 24 home runs and 110 RBI. He hit 21 home runs in 2016, his fourth consecutive year with at least 20 home runs, and accomplishing the feat at age 40.

Lee retired from professional baseball at the end of the 2017 season.

See also 
 List of KBO career home run leaders
 List of KBO career RBI leaders

External links 
 
 Profile and stats on the KBO official site

Haitai Tigers players
NC Dinos players
SSG Landers players
KBO League first basemen
KBO League designated hitters
South Korean baseball players
1976 births
Living people
Sportspeople from Gwangju